Bonham may refer to:
 Bonham (surname), an English and Welsh surname
 Bonham (band), a British hard rock band formed by Jason Bonham
 Bonham (Rouse), a percussion work by Christopher Rouse
 Bonham, Wiltshire, a place in the United Kingdom
 Bonham, Texas, a place in the United States

See also
Justice Bonham (disambiguation)
Bonham Carter family, British surname
 Dr. Bonham's Case, a legal case decided in 1610 concerning the supremacy of the common law in England
Bonhams, British auction house